Reeves House may refer to:

Reeves-Melson House, Bonnerdale, AR, listed on the NRHP in Arkansas
W. F. Reeves House, Marshall, AR, listed on the NRHP in Arkansas
Reeves House (Siloam Springs, Arkansas), listed on the NRHP in Arkansas
Reeves House (Highland Park, California), listed as a Los Angeles Historic-Cultural Monument
Jabez Reeves Farmstead, Rushville, IN, listed on the NRHP in Indiana
Jane Ross Reeves Octagon House, Shirley, IN, listed on the NRHP in Indiana
Reeves Farmstead Historic District, LeMars, IA, listed on the NRHP in Iowa
W. L. Reeves House, Elkton, KY, listed on the NRHP in Kentucky
Reiley-Reeves House, Baton Rouge, LA, listed on the NRHP in Louisiana
Reeves-Iszard-Godfey House, Upper Township, NJ, listed on the NRHP in New Jersey
Jeremiah Reeves House and Carriage House, Dover, OH, listed on the NRHP in Ohio
Reeves-Womack House, Caldwell, TX, listed on the NRHP in Texas
Sylvester H. Reeves House, Beaver, UT, listed on the NRHP in Utah
John C. Reeves House, Wellsburg, WV, listed on the NRHP in West Virginia